Moses & the Shepherd is an album by Iranian tenor singer Shahram Nazeri.

Track listing
Rumi is credited as the "poet" for each track.
Daramad
Moses to Shepeherd
Shepherd to Moses
God's voice
Music and Instrument
Music and Instrument
Song
Masnavi Vocal
Song

Personnel
Vocals – Shahram Nazeri
Other performers – Jalal Zolfonun, Behzad Forouhari, and Mohammad Hooman
Poetry by Rumi

See also
Moses and Shepherd (story)

References

External links
Official Shahram Nazeri website

Shahram Nazeri albums